is one of the preserved throwing techniques, Habukareta Waza, of Judo. It belonged to the fifth group, Gokyo, of the 1895 Gokyo no Waza lists. It is categorized as a side sacrifice technique, Yoko-sutemi.

See also
 the Canon of Judo

References

Judo technique